Gangoh Assembly constituency is one of the 403 constituencies of the Uttar Pradesh Legislative Assembly, India. It is a part of the Saharanpur district and one of the five assembly constituencies in the Kairana Lok Sabha constituency. First assembly election in this assembly constituency was conducted in 2012 after the constituency came into existence in the year 2008 as a result of the "Delimitation of Parliamentary and Assembly Constituencies Order, 2008".

Wards / Areas

Extent of Gangoh Assembly is Ambehta, Gangoh, Ambehta NP, Titron NP & Gangoh NPP of Nakur Tehsil; Nanauta & Nanauta NP of Deoband Tehsil in Saharanpur district.

Members of the Legislative Assembly

Election Results

2022

2019

2017

2012

16th Vidhan Sabha: 2012 Assembly Elections.

See also

Saharanpur district
Kairana (Lok Sabha c inonstituency)
Government of Uttar Pradesh
List of Vidhan Sabha constituencies of Uttar Pradesh
Uttar Pradesh
Uttar Pradesh Legislative Assembly
Kirat Singh Gurjar

References

External links
 

Assembly constituencies of Uttar Pradesh
Politics of Saharanpur district
Constituencies established in 2008
2008 establishments in Uttar Pradesh